Tavares Henderson Strachan (born December 16, 1979) is a Bahamian-born conceptual artist. His contemporary multi-media installations investigate science, technology, mythology, history, and exploration. He lives and works in New York City and Nassau, Bahamas.

Early life and education
Strachan was born in Nassau, Bahamas on December 16, 1979. Strachan was introduced to the arts as a child through his family’s involvement in Junkanoo, a historical annual parade and cultural celebration incorporating live music, dance, and elaborate costumes hand-made by competing groups.

Initially a painter, Strachan earned his Associate of Fine Arts degree from the College of the Bahamas in 1999. In 2000, he moved to the United States to enroll in the glass department at the Rhode Island School of Design, where he began to pursue more conceptual projects that would foreground the prevalent themes and minimalist aesthetic of his later work. After completing his Bachelor of Fine Arts degree at the Rhode Island School of Design in 2003, Strachan went on to earn his Master of Fine Arts degree in Sculpture from Yale University in 2006.

Work 
Strachan’s ambitious and open-ended practice examines the intersection of art, science, and the environment, and has included collaborations with numerous organizations and institutions across the disciplines.

The Distance Between What We Have and What We Want (2006) 
One of Strachan’s most iconic projects was The Distance Between What We Have and What We Want (2006), for which he embarked on a journey to the Alaskan Arctic to excavate a 2.5-ton block of ice which was then transported via FedEx to his native Bahamas and displayed in a solar-powered freezer in the courtyard of his childhood elementary school. The piece is both physically arresting and metaphorically resonant, referencing the fragility of Earth’s homeostatic systems, the strange poetry of cultural and physical displacement, as well as the little-known contributions of Matthew Henson—an under-recognized American explorer and the co-discoverer of the North Pole.

Orthostatic Tolerance series 
In 2004, Strachan initiated an ambitious four-year multimedia series entitled, Orthostatic Tolerance—the title referring to the physiological stress that cosmonauts endure while exiting and re-entering Earth from outer space. Exhibited in phases between 2008 and 2011, the Orthostatic Tolerance project incorporated photography, video, drawing, sculpture and installation documenting Strachan’s experience in cosmonaut training at the Yuri Gagarin Training Center in Star City, Russia and in experiments in space travel conducted in Nassau under the Bahamas Air and Space Exploration Center (BASEC)—the artist’s version of NASA for his native country.

Seen/Unseen (2011) 
In 2011, Strachan exhibited Seen/Unseen—a survey exhibition of past and present works—at an undisclosed location in New York City that was deliberately closed to the general public. Exploring themes of presence and absence, the exhibition focused on the artist’s critical mandate of positioning works in such a way that some of their aspects are visible while others remain conceptual, asserting the exhibition itself is a work of art in its own right.  Both ambitious in scope and disruptive to expectations, Seen/Unseen manifested a type of meditative experience, presenting over 50 works from drawings, photographs, video works, sculpture, and installations in a massive 20,000-square-foot industrial space converted specifically for the exhibition.  While access to "Seen/Unseen" was restricted to the organizers, the exhibition itself was fully documented with a website and an illustrated catalogue designed by Stefan Sagmeister.

ENOCH (2018) 
On December 3, 2018, Strachan launched his project ENOCH into space. Created in collaboration with the LACMA Art + Technology Lab, ENOCH is centered around the development and launch of a 3U satellite that brings to light the forgotten story of Robert Henry Lawrence Jr., the first African American astronaut selected for any national space program. The satellite launched via Spaceflight’s SSO-A SmallSat Express mission from Vandenberg Air Force Base on a SpaceX Falcon 9 rocket. The sculpture circled the Earth for three years in a sun-synchronous orbit before reentering on December 21, 2021.

Marian Goodman
Strachan is represented by Marian Goodman since 2020, and in that same year, the Gallery's London space presented In Plain Sight, the artist's first major UK solo show and in 2020, his The Awakening was presented at Goodman's Manhattan space.

Awards and honors 
His recognition includes a MacArthur Foundation Grant (2022), the Inaugural Allen Institute artist-in-residence (2018), LACMA Art + Technology Lab artist grant (2014), Tiffany Foundation grant (2008), Grand Arts Residency Fellowship (2007), and Alice B. Kimball fellowship (2006). In 2013, he represented the Bahamas at the 55th Venice Biennale.

See also 
 List of Bahamian artists

References

1979 births
African-American artists
American artists
American people of Bahamian descent
Bahamian artists
Living people
People from Nassau, Bahamas
Rhode Island School of Design alumni
Yale University alumni
University of the Bahamas alumni
21st-century African-American people
20th-century African-American people